Ruth Faison Shaw (1889–1969) was an American artist, educator who is credited with introducing finger painting into the USA as an art education medium. She developed her techniques while working in Rome, Italy, patenting a safe non-toxic paint in 1931.

Early life
Shaw was born in Kenansville, North Carolina, on October 15, 1889. Her father was a Presbyterian minister and she had four brothers. She attended elementary school in Cabarrus County, North Carolina. She graduated from a Presbyterian girls school, the James Sprunt Institute, in 1906. She also attended the Peabody Conservatory in Baltimore. After graduation she gained some experience as (an untrained) school teacher in the Appalachian Mountains in Transylvania County, North Carolina.

In 1918 Shaw travelled to France and Italy with the Young Women's Christian Association (YWCA), before setting up a school in Rome.

Finger painting
Shaw is credited with developing the art of finger painting and later introducing it into the American education system. She later claimed she had been inspired when she saw a child smearing iodine onto a wall, realising children liked to 'smear'. This event took place in 1926, when Shaw had already founded an experimental school, the Shaw School, for English-speaking children. Shaw developed the techniques and materials required for finger painting. In 1931 she patented a gelatinous paint medium that would be safe for children.

Shaw returned to the USA in 1932. She took a job in the progressive Dalton School in New York City, where she introduced finger painting to the curriculum. An exhibition of finger painting art took place in Manhattan in 1933. She published several books on finger painting.

Later career
Shaw came to be seen as a pioneer in progressive education. She was invited to lecture about finger painting and organize exhibitions. She started a factory in New York to produce her paint. Finger painting workshops were started for adults. In 1942 she became a lecturer at Teachers College, Columbia University.

Shaw died in Fayetteville, North Carolina in 1969. A collection of her papers are held at the Southern Historical Collection at the University of North Carolina.

Selected works

References

External links
 
 

1880s births
1969 deaths
20th-century American painters
20th-century American women artists
American art educators
American women painters
People from Kenansville, North Carolina
Teachers College, Columbia University faculty
American women academics